Kentledge (fr. ballast), or kentledge weights, are slabs or blocks of concrete or iron (usually pig iron, sometimes with a cast-in handle for assist moving). They are used within ships or boats as permanent, high-density ballast. They may also be used as counterweights in cranes such as tower cranes or swing bridges as is found in the Victoria Swing Bridge. On construction sites, prior to the erection of a building, static load testing may use a large number of kentledge stacked onto a platform. This platform is used to drive piles into the ground beneath to test the integrity of the foundation.

References

Mechanisms (engineering)
Watercraft components